Laëtitia Romeiro Dias is a French politician representing En Marche! She was elected to the French National Assembly on 18 June 2017, representing the Third Constituency of Essonne.

See also
 2017 French legislative election

References

1981 births
Living people
Deputies of the 15th National Assembly of the French Fifth Republic
La République En Marche! politicians
21st-century French women politicians
Politicians from Paris
Women members of the National Assembly (France)
Members of Parliament for Essonne